Spectamen flavidum is a species of sea snail, a marine gastropod mollusk in the family Solariellidae. The height of the shell attains 3.5 mm, its diameter 4.5 mm. This marine species is endemic to New Zealand and occurs off Three Kings Islands at depths between 90 m and 550 m.

References

External links

flavidum
Gastropods of New Zealand
Gastropods described in 1999